Dreamland was an amusement park in Coney Island, Brooklyn, New York City that operated at the site of the defunct Astroland park for the 2009 season.  It was replaced with a new Luna Park the following year.

The park was operated by Anthony Raffaele for Thor Equities. The park contained two large freak shows as well as independent attractions to see a giant snake, a giant rat (really a baby capybara), and a tiny woman.  It also included a carousel, a scrambler, and other rides.

Thor Equities shut the park down before the end of the 2009 season due to $600,000 in unpaid back rent, locking them out in the middle of the night without a formal eviction.

References

Coney Island
Defunct amusement parks in New York (state)
2009 establishments in New York City
2009 disestablishments in New York (state)
Amusement parks opened in 2009
Amusement parks closed in 2009